Lippo Plaza is a 38 floor tower in the Luwan District of Shanghai, China and was completed in 1998. It was built by architect Frank C Y Feng and Associates Limited.

See also

 List of tallest buildings in Shanghai

References

Skyscrapers in Shanghai
Retail buildings in China
Skyscraper office buildings in Shanghai